Lestander is a Swedish surname.

Geographical distribution
As of 2014, 90.7% of all known bearers of the surname Lestander were residents of Sweden, 4.2% of Canada, 2.6% of Norway and 1.0% of the United States.

In Sweden, the frequency of the surname was higher than national average (1:26,541) in the following counties:
 1. Norrbotten (1:1,363)
 2. Västerbotten (1:3,832)

People
Klas Lestander (born 1931), Swedish biathlete 
Ove Lestander (born 1941), Swedish cross country skier

References

Swedish-language surnames